2:Hrs is a 2018 British comedy film directed by Darren Newton, starring Harry Jarvis, Ella-Rae Smith and Alhaji Fofana.

Cast
 Harry Jarvis as Tim Edge
 Ella-Rae Smith as Victoria
 Alhaji Fofana as Alf
 Keith Allen as Lewis Groad
 Siobhan Redmond as Lena Eidelhorn
 Seann Walsh as Tooley
 Marek Larwood as Graves
 Kirsty Dillon as Ellie Edge
 Fabienne Piolini-Castle as Shona Edge
 Tomi May as Anatoli
 Zara Symes as Miss Forrest
 Lelia Yvetta as Georgia Miston
 Andromeda Godfrey as Rachel Halliday
 Bruce Herbelin-Earle as Harry
 Flynn Matthews as Graham

Reception
Darryl M. of Dove.org called the film "enjoyable, if slightly corny".

Renee Longstreet of Common Sense Media rated the film 3 stars out of 5 and wrote that the film's "outlandish" concept is "made plausible" by the "sincere" performances of Jarvis, Smith and Fofana.

Film critic Kim Newman called the film the "nearest thing we’re going to get to a Children's Film Foundation movie this century".

References

External links
 
 

British comedy films
2018 comedy films
2010s English-language films
English-language comedy films